Rebecca Cobb is a British children's book illustrator who grew up in Buckinghamshire and Somerset, and lives in Falmouth. Along with writing and illustrating her own books, she has collaborated with other authors including Julia Donaldson, Richard Curtis and Helen Dunmore.

Career

Cobb graduated from Falmouth College of Arts in 2004. After graduating, she worked with The Child Bereavement Charity, Continuum Publishing Group, The Guardian, The Independent, Mabecron Books, Marion Boyars Publishers, Waitrose Food Illustrated and You Magazine.

She collaborated with several authors after graduating from Falmouth. Her first solo project, Missing Mummy was published in 2011 by Macmillan Publishers and centers around the theme of child bereavement.

Awards and nominations

 2013 – Lunchtime won a Waterstones Children's Book Prize for Best Picture Book
 2014 – The Empty Stocking won a Heart of Hawick Children’s Book Award for Best Picture Book (collaborated with Richard Curtis)
 2014 – The Paper Dolls was shortlisted for the Kate Greenaway Medal (collaborated with Julia Donaldson)
 2019 – Jane Addams Children's Book Award for The Day War Came, written by Nicola Davies and illustrated by Cobb

References

British children's book illustrators
English children's book illustrators
British women children's writers
Living people
Year of birth missing (living people)